is a Japanese dancer and actor, he is a member of the Japanese group The Rampage from Exile Tribe.

Career 
Makoto attended EXPG (Exile Professional Gym) of Tokyo and auditioned for The Rampage via Global Japan Challenge.

In September 2014, he became an official member of the group.

As a child he featured in some EXILE music videos and also used to be a Generations from Exile Tribe support member from 2011 to 2013.

He is one of the members of a Krump dance crew "Rag Pound" with fellow members Kaisei Takechi and Kazuma Kawamura.

In October 2018, he made his acting debut with drama "Prince Of Legend".

In September 2019, Makoto played in the YouTube web drama Shujin-kō (主人公).

Works

Choreography

Filmography

TV series

Movies

Web Dramas

Music Videos

Game

References

External links 
 The Rampage Official Website

1998 births
21st-century Japanese male actors
Japanese male dancers
LDH (company) artists
Living people
People from Kanagawa Prefecture